Medicharla is a village in Kotapadu Mandal in the Anakapalli district of Andhra Pradesh State, India.

Villages in Anakapalli district